The Northern Carpet Trades Union (NCTU) was a trade union in the United Kingdom. It was first formed in 1892 in Halifax, West Yorkshire, later expanding to cover all of Northern England. The NCTU was formed later than the Power Loom Carpet Weavers' and Textile Workers' Association, based in Kidderminster, and was considerably smaller. Approximately a fifth of eligible workers were members of the NCTU in 1939, compared to 50 percent for the Kidderminster union. Attempts to amalgamate all unions in the carpet trade failed, but in 1917 the National Affiliation of Carpet Trade Unions was established with equal representation from the NCTU, Scottish Carpet Workers' Union, National Union of Dyers, Bleachers and Textile Workers and Power Loom Carpet Weavers' and Textile Workers' Union.

The NCTU originally only represented carpet weavers, but later came to represent all employees in the carpet industry including a staff section for supervisors and management. It merged with the Transport and General Workers' Union in 2000.

General Secretaries
1915: Ellis Crowther

1950: H. H. Clee
1954: H. D. Pickles
1967: Reginald Townsend
1972: Leslie R. Smith
1980s: Keith Edmondson

See also

 TGWU amalgamations

References

Further reading

Defunct trade unions of the United Kingdom
Textile and clothing trade unions
Transport and General Workers' Union amalgamations
Trade unions disestablished in 2000
Trade unions based in West Yorkshire